is an arts complex in Mito, Ibaraki, Japan. It opened in 1990 as part of the centennial celebrations of the municipality of Mito. There is a concert hall that seats 680, a theater for up to 636, a contemporary art gallery, and a landmark tower. Arata Isozaki was the architect, with acoustical design by Nagata Acoustics. The design is based on the Boerdijk–Coxeter helix.

See also

 Kairakuen
 Nara Centennial Hall

References

External links
 

Mito, Ibaraki
Concert halls in Japan
Theatres in Japan
Contemporary art galleries in Japan
Buildings and structures in Ibaraki Prefecture
Tourist attractions in Ibaraki Prefecture
Event venues established in 1990
1990 establishments in Japan
Theatres completed in 1990